Haghtanak is a village in the Noyemberyan Municipality of the Tavush Province of Armenia, located near the Armenia–Georgia border.

References

External links 

Populated places in Tavush Province